Benito Vicetto Pérez (Ferrol, Spain, 21  May 1824 - Ferrol, 28 May 1878)  was a Galician journalist, historian, playwright and novelist.

As a historian, his main work is the Historia de Galicia (1865). He wrote stories and comedies in Spanish, as well as three poems in Galician language.

1824 births
1878 deaths
People from Galicia (Spain)
People from Ferrol, Spain
Spanish male writers
19th-century Spanish historians
19th-century male writers